Rasmus Krag may refer to:
 Rasmus Krag (1680 - 1755), Danish naval officer
 Rasmus Krag (1763 - 1838), Danish military officer